Rezvaniyeh Rural District is a rural district (dehestan) in the Central District of Tiran and Karvan County, Isfahan Province, Iran. At the 2006 census, its population was 4,303, in 1,303 families.  The rural district has 31 villages.

References 

Rural Districts of Isfahan Province
Tiran and Karvan County